Ahmad Khan Donboli was the second khan of the Khoy Khanate from 1763 to 1786

References

People from Khoy
Khoy Khanate
1745 births
1786 deaths
Donboli tribe